Viqualine (INN) (developmental code name PK-5078) is an antidepressant and anxiolytic drug that was never marketed. It acts as a potent and selective serotonin releasing agent and serotonin reuptake inhibitor. In addition, viqualine displaces diazepam from the GABAA receptor and produces benzodiazepine-like effects, indicating that it is also a positive allosteric modulator of the benzodiazepine site of the GABAA receptor. The drug has mainly been researched as a potential treatment for alcoholism.

See also
 Indalpine
 Pipequaline

References

Vinyl compounds
Antidepressants
Anxiolytics
GABAA receptor positive allosteric modulators
Phenol ethers
Piperidines
Quinolines
Serotonin releasing agents